The 11th Beijing College Student Film Festival was an event held by the Beijing Normal University and Beijing Municipal Bureau of Radio, Film and Television in 2004 in Beijing's Millennium Monument Hall, Beijing, China.

Awards
 Best Film Award: Nuan
 Best Director Award: Zheng Dongtian for My Bitter Sweet Taiwan
 Best Actor Award: Fan Wei for The Parking Attendant In July
 Best Actress Award: Yu Nan for Jingzhe
 Best Visual Effects Award: Warriors of Heaven and Earth
 Best First Film Award: The Winter Solstice
 Favorite Actor Award: Jiang Wen for Warriors of Heaven and Earth, Chen Kun for Baober In Love
 Favorite Actress Award: Zhao Wei for Warriors of Heaven and Earth and Jade Goddess of Mercy
 Favorite Director: Feng Xiaogang for Cell Phone
 Artistic Exploration Award: Baober In Love
 Grand Prix Award: Cell Phone
 Committee Special Award: Mao Zedong: A Charismatic Leader, Profoundly Affecting, The Days Touched By Love
 Best Child Actor Award: Huang Doudou

References

External links
 11th Beijing College Student Film Festival Tencent
 11th Beijing College Student Film Festival Sina

Beijing College Student Film Festival
2004 film festivals
2004 festivals in Asia
Bei